Berdak, a village in Goghtn Region of Armenia, currently included into Ordubad region of Nakhichevan autonomy of Azerbaijan.

The village has been located on a hill surrounded by gardens. Ruins of St. Hovhannes church has remained in the village. According to construction recording, the church was the last time reconstructed in 1888.

Populated places in Armenia